Middlebury Township may refer to the following places in the United States:

 Middlebury Township, Elkhart County, Indiana
 Middlebury Township, Michigan
 Middlebury Township, Knox County, Ohio
 Middlebury Township, Pennsylvania

Township name disambiguation pages